Stewart Francis Granger (born October 27, 1961) is a Canadian former National Basketball Association (NBA) player and Canadian national team member.

Though in his early years Granger grew up in Montreal, his high school years were spent attending and playing basketball at Nazareth Regional High School in Brooklyn, New York, USA. Granger won the New York State high school finals in 1979 playing for NYC-Nazareth. Granger played college basketball at Villanova University, where his career averages were 10.4 points per game and 4.8 assists per game.

In the 1983 NBA Draft, Granger was selected by the Cleveland Cavaliers at the 24th overall pick.

In 1984, his first season, Granger played with the team that drafted him, the Cleveland Cavaliers, an average 4.5 points per game and 2.4 assists per game.  In his second season, he played for the Atlanta Hawks, where he averaged 1.8 points per game, and 1.3 assists per game.  Then in his final NBA season, which was in 1987 with the New York Knicks, he averaged 3.3 points per game and 1.8 assists per game.

Granger was also a first team USBL All-Star in 1986 while a member of the Wildwood Aces. He also had a career in the Philippine Basketball Association.

See also
 List of Montreal athletes
 List of famous Montrealers

References

External links
 
 FrozenHoops.com History of NBA basketball in Canada. Selection of Top 100 Canadian players of all time

1961 births
Living people
Alviks BK players
Anglophone Quebec people
Atlanta Hawks players
Basketball players from Montreal
Black Canadian basketball players
Canadian expatriate basketball people in Sweden
Canadian expatriate basketball people in the United States
Canadian expatriate basketball people in the Philippines
Canadian men's basketball players
1982 FIBA World Championship players
1990 FIBA World Championship players
Cleveland Cavaliers draft picks
Cleveland Cavaliers players
Florida Stingers players
Maine Windjammers players
National Basketball Association players from Canada
New York Knicks players
Philippine Basketball Association imports
Point guards
Sarasota Stingers players
Sportspeople from Brooklyn
Basketball players from New York City
Villanova Wildcats men's basketball players
Shell Turbo Chargers players